Chuy is a city in Uruguay.

Chuy may also refer to:

Places
 Chüy District of Kyrgyzstan
 Chüy Prospekti, a major avenue in Bishkek, Kyrgyzstan
 Chūy Qal‘eh, Iran
 Chüy Region of Kyrgyzstan
 Chüy, the Kyrgyz name for the river Chu in Kyrgyzstan and Kazakhstan
 Chuy Stream, in Brazil and Uruguay
 Chüy Valley, valley located in north Tian-Shan
 Chüy, Kemin, village in the Kemin District, Chüy Region, Kyrgyzstan
 Chüy, Kyrgyzstan, town in the Chüy District, Chüy Region, Kyrgyzstan
 Posta del Chuy, historic landmark in Cerro Largo Department, Uruguay
 Barra del Chuy

People
 Chuy Bravo (1956–2019), Mexican-American actor and entertainer
 Don Chuy (1941–2014), American football player
 Jesús "Chuy" García (born 1956), American politician
 Chuy Sanchez (born 1990), Mexican professional footballer
 Chuy Andrade (born 1956), a ring name of Espanto Jr.
 Chuy Hinojosa (born 1946), politician

Characters 
 Chuy Castillos, Cheech Marin's character on The Golden Palace
 Chuy, title character of Ceasar and Chuy animated television series

Other uses
 Chuy tribes, a collective name for a group of Hunnic tribes Chuüe, Chumi, Chumuhun, Chuban, and Shato
 Chuy (TV program), a teen magazine show in ABS-CBN Northern Mindanao
 Chuy's, a Tex-Mex chain restaurant
An affectionate nickname for those with Jesus in their names

See also
 Chucho
 Chui (disambiguation)
 Chewy (disambiguation)